The 1988 Olympic commemorative coins are a series of commemorative coins which were issued by the United States Mint in 1988.

Legislation
The 1988 Olympic Commemorative Coin Act authorized the production of two coins, a silver dollar and a gold half eagle. Congress authorized the coins to support the training of American athletes participating in the 1988 Olympic Games. The act allowed the coins to be struck in both proof and uncirculated finishes.

Designs

Dollar

The obverse of the 1988 Olympic commemorative dollar, designed by Patrica L. Verani, features Lady Liberty's torch and the Olympic torch merging into a single symbolic flame with an olive branch encircling the torches. The reverse, designed by Sheryl J. Winter, features the five-ring logo of the U.S. Olympic Committee, framed by a pair of olive branches.

Half eagle

The obverse of the 1988 Olympic commemorative half eagle, designed by Elizabeth Jones, features Nike, Greek goddess of victory, in a wreath of olive leaves. The reverse of the coin, designed by Marcel Jovine features the Olympic flame.

Specifications 
Dollar
 Display Box Color: Maroon
 Edge: Reeded
 Weight: 26.730 grams; 0.8594 troy ounce
 Diameter: 38.10 millimeters; 1.50 inches
 Composition: 90% Silver, 10% Copper

Half Eagle
 Display Box Color: Maroon
 Edge: Reeded
 Weight: 8.359 grams; 0.2687 troy ounce
 Diameter: 21.59 millimeters; 0.850 inch
 Composition: 90% Gold, 3.6% Silver, 6.4% Copper

See also

 United States commemorative coins
 List of United States commemorative coins and medals (1980s)
 1984 Summer Olympics commemorative coins
 1992 Olympic commemorative coins

References

Modern United States commemorative coins